Zbyslavice is a municipality and village in Ostrava-City District in the Moravian-Silesian Region of the Czech Republic. It has about 700 inhabitants.

References

Villages in Ostrava-City District